Voose may refer to several places in Estonia:

Voose, Harju County, village in Anija Parish, Harju County
Voose, Lääne County, village in Hanila Parish, Lääne County